"I Told Them All About You" is a popular song written in 1927 by Cliff Friend.  The song was a hit for the Welsh singer Donald Peers, reaching the top of the charts in Australia in June 1950.

Charts

References

1927 songs
1950 singles